The Warner School of Education and Human Development is a graduate school of education that prepares practitioners and scholars in the areas of teacher education, counseling, K-12 school leadership, higher education, human development, and educational policy. The school is part of the University of Rochester and located in Rochester, New York.

Mission 
The Warner School mission consists of three pillars: Prepare, Generate, and Collaborate.
PREPARE practitioners and researchers who are knowledgeable, reflective, skilled and caring educators, who can make a difference in individual lives as well as their fields, and who are leaders and agents of change; 
GENERATE and disseminate knowledge leading to new understandings of education and human development, on which more effective educational policies and practices can be grounded; 
COLLABORATE – across disciplines, professions and constituencies – to promote change that can significantly improve education and support positive human development.

Degrees and Program Areas 
The Warner School offers certificate, master’s and doctoral (EdD, PhD) programs in many areas.
The Warner School offers master's and doctoral degree programs in teaching and curriculum; counseling; human development; school leadership; higher education; and educational policy.

Teaching and Curriculum 
The Warner School offers teacher preparation programs leading to New York State certification in early childhood education; elementary education; middle school and secondary education in Mathematics, Science (Earth Science, Biology, Chemistry, Physics), English, Social Studies, Foreign Language (French, Spanish, German and Latin). The Warner School also prepares teachers for certification in literacy, inclusive education, and teaching English to speakers of other languages (TESOL).

Counseling and Human Development 
Programs in counseling include: School Counseling, School & Community Counseling, Community Mental Health Counseling, Gerontological Counseling, and Student Affairs Counseling.

Programs in Human Development include: General Studies, Early Childhood, Developmental Differences, Family Studies, Gerontology, and Research.

Raymond F. LeChase Hall 
In the spring of 2011, construction began on Raymond F. LeChase Hall, the new home for the Warner School. The building was named in memory of Raymond F. LeChase, founder of LeChase Construction Services, LLC, who was a pioneer in the Rochester construction community, renowned philanthropist, and dedicated supporter of education. Raymond F. LeChase Hall was the first major building constructed in the historic Wilson Quadrangle on River Campus in 30 years. A four-story,  facility, it provides a unified home for the Warner School and will feature an expansive suite of 14 classrooms on the first floor that will serve the College during the day and the Warner School in the evening, providing an efficient solution to the critical need for classroom space on River Campus. Le Chase Hall opened in January 2013 and was dedicated in May 2013.

Accreditations 
 National Council for Accreditation of Teacher Education
 Council for Accreditation of Counseling and Related Educational Programs

References

External links

 "Building: Raymond F. LeChase Hall", Margaret Warner Graduate School of Education and Human Development

University of Rochester
Universities and colleges in Monroe County, New York
Schools of education in New York (state)
Educational institutions established in 1958
1958 establishments in New York (state)